The Melanesia Cup 2000 was the seventh and the last Melanesia-wide tournament ever held. It took place in Fiji and five teams participated: Fiji, Solomon Islands, New Caledonia, Papua New Guinea and Vanuatu and served for the third time as an Oceania Nations Cup qualifier.

The teams played each other according to a round-robin format with Fiji winning the tournament for the fifth time and qualifying to the Oceania Nations Cup 2000 along with Solomon Islands. However, 3rd place Vanuatu replaced Fiji at the latter Cup due to civil unrest in Fiji following a coup by George Speight, who overthrew Fiji's democratically elected government.

Results

Solomon Islands and  Vanuatu* qualified for Oceania Nations Cup 2000

 Fiji were replaced by Vanuatu (due to civil unrest taking place in Fiji).

References 

Melanesia Cup
1999–2000 in OFC football
2000
2000 in Fijian sport
2000 OFC Nations Cup
April 2000 sports events in Oceania